Fenshui (分水) may refer to:

Towns
Fenshui, Chongqing, in Wanzhou District, Chongqing, China
Fenshui, Hubei, in Hanchuan, Hubei, China
Fenshui, Suining, in Anju District, Suining, Sichuan, China
Fenshui, Xuyong County, in Xuyong County, Sichuan, China
Fenshui, Zhejiang, in Tonglu County, Zhejiang, China

Townships
Fenshui Township, Hunan, in Xiangtan County, Hunan, China
Fenshui Township, Guizhou, in Wuchuan Gelao and Miao Autonomous County, Guizhou, China